Salle is the French word for 'hall', 'room' or 'auditorium', as in:

Salle des Concerts Herz, a former Paris concert hall
Salle Favart, theatre of the Paris Opéra-Comique
Salle Le Peletier, former home of the Paris Opéra
Salle Pleyel, a Paris concert hall
Salle Ventadour, a former Paris theatre
Salle Wilfrid-Pelletier, a multipurpose venue in Montréal

It may also refer to:

Places:
Salle, Norfolk, a village and civil parish in England, pronounced "Saul"
Salle, Abruzzo, Italy
Salle, Nepal

People:
Abraham Salle (1670–1719), Huguenot ancestor, immigrant, and colonist
Alexander Östlund, Swedish football player, nicknamed "Salle"
Auguste Sallé French traveller and entomologist
David Salle, American painter
Fred Salle, English long jumper
Jérôme Salle, French film director
Johan Sälle, Swedish ice hockey player
Mary Lou Sallee, American politician from Missouri

See also
 La Salle (disambiguation) (including LaSalle)
 Sal (disambiguation)
 Sall (disambiguation)